Chung Pui Ki (born 2 February 1998) is a Hongkonger footballer who plays as a defender for Hong Kong Women League club Kitchee SC. She is also a futsal player, and represented Hong Kong internationally in both football and futsal.

International career
Chung Pui Ki has been capped for Hong Kong at senior level in both football and futsal. In football, she represented Hong Kong at the 2013 AFC U-16 Women's Championship, two AFC U-19 Women's Championship editions (2015 and 2017), the 2018 Asian Games and the 2020 AFC Women's Olympic Qualifying Tournament.

In futsal, Chung Pui Ki played for Hong Kong at the 2015 AFC Women's Futsal Championship.

International goals

See also
List of Hong Kong women's international footballers

References

1998 births
Living people
Hong Kong women's futsal players
Hong Kong women's footballers
Women's association football defenders
Hong Kong women's international footballers